Jambuvijaya (1923–2009), also known as Muni Jambuvijayji Maharajsaheb, was a monk belonging to the Tapa Gaccha order of Svetambara sect of Jainism. He was known for his pioneering work in research, cataloguing and translations of Jain Agamas and ancient texts. He was responsible for discovering and publishing many ancient Jains texts lying in different forgotten Jain jnana bhandaras (ancient Jain libraries). He was a disciple of Muni Punyavijay. Both Muni Punyavijay and Jambuvijay worked all their life in the compilation and publication of ancient Jain Agama literature and cataloguing ancient Jain jnana bhandaras. Muni Jambuvijay was a scholar who devoted his entire life to critically editing Jain scriptures.

Early life and family
Jambuvijaya was born as Chunilal Bhogilal Joitram in 1923 in town of Mandal, Gujarat. His father's name was Bhogilal Mohanlal Joitram (1895–1959) and his mother's name was Aniben Popatlal (1894–1995). He was born in a deeply religious family. His father took vow of lifelong celibacy in 1925 and was initiated as a Jain monk Muni Bhuvanvijaya in 1932. His mother took initiation as Sadhavi Manoharashriji in 1939 under her own sister Sadhavi Labhashriji. All of Jambuvijayaji's aunts were initiated as sadhavi's and there were a number of initiations in his mother's family.

Monkhood
In Ratlam in 1937, at the age of 14 he took initiation as a Jain monk under his father, Acarya Bhuvanvijaya, who became his teacher. Later on he studied under Acarya Punyavijaya and assisted him cataloguing various Jain manuscripts. After the death of Muni Punyavijaya, he became the chief editor of the Jain Agama series. Muni Jambuvijayji was a polyglot and knew 16 languages. Among them were Sanskrit, Prakrit, Pali, Apabhramsha, Gujarati, Hindi, Tibetan and some others.

Revival of ancient scriptures
Prof. Dr. John Cort mentions the difficulties faced and the persistence shown by Muni Jambuvijay in ensuring that ancient manuscripts which were under lock and key were brought to light. Many bhandaras like the one at Patan were unopened for decades or centuries and Muni Jambuvijay had to often use his mendicant charisma to convince the trustee to open up the libraries.

Agama research and editing

List of Books critically edited by Muni Punyavijayji and successor Muni Jambuvijayji: 
Viyah pannati suttam Part-1
Viyah pannati suttam Part-2
Viyah pannati suttam Part-3
Nayadhamma kahao
Suyagdang sutra
Dasveyaliya suttam, Uttarjzhayanaim, Avassay suttam
Sthananga Sutra Part-1
Sthananga Sutra Part-2
Sthananga Sutra Part-3
Painnay Suttai Part-1
Painnay Suttai Part-2
Painnay Suttai Part-3
Nandisutt And Anuogddaraim
Pannavana Suttam Part-1
Pannavana Suttam Part-2
Anuyogdwar sutra Part-1
Anuyogdwar sutra Part-2
Dwadsharam Naychakram Part-1
Dwadsharam Naychakram Part-2
Dwadsharam Naychakram Part-3
Panch sutrakam with Tika
Aendra Stuti Chaturvinshika Sah Swo Vivran
Siddhahem sabdanushasana Sah swopagya (San) Laghuvrutti
Mahapacchakkhan Painniyam
Divsagar pannatti Painnayam
Tandulveyaliya Painnayam
Samavayanga Sutra
Stree Nirvan Kevalibhukti Prakarane
Surimantra Kalp Samucchaya
Thanangsuttam and Samvayangsuttam Part-3
Ayarang suttam (Acaranga Sutra)
Mahanisiha Suya Khandham
Nandisuttam
Dasakalia suttam
Sutrakrutang sutra Vol-1
Hastalikhit Granthsuchi Part-1
Hastalikhit Granthsuchi Part-2
Hastalikhit Granthsuchi Part-3

Death
Jambuvijay died in a road accident on 12 November 2009 at the age of 87 years. Early morning, he was travelling by foot along with other monks from Balotra to Jaisalmer when they were hit by a truck.  He along with Namaskarvijay died in the accident and others are seriously injured. They were cremated at Shankheshvar on Sami Road in Patan. The deaths of Jain ascetics in road accidents while travelling barefoot, resulted in widespread protests by Jains and they demanded for an investigation.

References

Scholars of Jainism
Indian Sanskrit scholars
1923 births
2009 deaths
Indian Jain monks
20th-century Indian Jains
20th-century Jain monks
20th-century Indian monks
Śvētāmbara monks